The title of Chief Justice of Quebec is assumed by the chief justice of the Court of Appeal of Quebec. From 1849 to 1974 it was assumed by the Chief Justice from the Court of Queen's Bench or Court of King's Bench.

Chief Justice of the Province of Quebec (1763-1791)

Chief Justice of Lower Canada (1791-1841)

Chief Justice of Canada East (1841-1867)

Chief Justice of Quebec (since 1867)

References

External links 
 Court of Appeal of Quebec, "Former judges".

Quebec courts
Lists of Canadian judges